David Veronese (17th century) was an Italian economist from Genoa.

Life 
Veronese's works were considered milestones for the merchant business.

Works

References 

Italian economists
Writers from Genoa
Year of birth missing
Year of death missing
17th-century deaths